The ninth election to the Carmarthenshire County Council was held in March 1913. It was preceded by the 1910 election and followed, due to the First World War and the postponement of the 1916 elections, by the 1919 election.

Overview of the result

The Liberals retained a strong majority although the elections were far less politicized than in previous years. With a few exceptions, members were returned unopposed.

Boundary changes

There were no boundary changes.

Candidates

Only two of those elected at the first election in 1889, and who had served continuosly since then, sought re-election.  Sir James Drummond, the Lord Lieutenant of Carmarthenshire and  D,C. Parry (Llanelli) were both returned unopposed.

Ward results

Abergwili

Ammanford

Bettws

Caio

Carmarthen Eastern Ward (Lower Division)

Carmarthen Eastern Ward (Upper Division)

Carmarthen Western Ward (Lower Division)

Carmarthen Western Ward (Upper Division)

Cenarth

Cilycwm

Conwil

Kidwelly

Laugharne

Llanarthney

Llanboidy

Llandebie

Llandilo Rural

Llandilo Urban

Llandovery

Llandyssilio

Llanedy

Llanegwad

Llanelly Division.1

Llanelly Division 2

Llanelly Division 3

Llanelly Division 4

Llanelly Division 5

Llanelly Division 6

Llanelly Division 7

Llanelly Division 8

Llanelly Rural, Berwick

Llanelly Rural, Hengoed

Llanelly Rural, Westfa and Glyn

Llanfihangel Aberbythick

Llanfihangel-ar-Arth

Llangadock

Llangeler

Llangendeirne

Llangennech

Llangunnor

Llanon

Llansawel

Llanstephan

Llanybyther

Mothvey

Pembrey North

Pembrey South

Quarter Bach

Rhydcymmerai

St Clears

St Ishmael

Trelech

Whitland

Election of aldermen

In addition to the 51 councillors the council consisted of 17 county aldermen. Aldermen were elected by the council, and served a six-year term. At the statutory meeting there was disagreemnet over the election of aldermen with the Liberals initially nominating eight of their number for the eight vacancies. Howerver, W.J. Williams of Brynamman withdrew in favour of a Conservative, Dudley Drummond.

Following the elections the following eight aldermen were elected.
H. Jones-Thomas, retiring alderman (47)
J. Llew. Thomas, retiring alderman (45) 
W. Mabon Davies, retiring alderman (44) 
Thomas Thomas, retiring alderman. (45) 
Dudley Drummond, from outside the council (48) 
Professor Jones, retiring alderman (47) 
C. E. Morris, retiring alderman (43) 
John Lewis, elected member for Cenarth (40)

Aldermanic vacancies between 1913 and 1919

Both W. Mabon Davies and Professor D.E. Jones died in the months following the election and the appointment of new aldermen in their place took place at the quarterly meeting of the council in late July. Several members objected to aspects of the process, includibg the perceived lack of aldermen from some parts of the county and the private meetings to decide upon nominations (from whiuch Conservative councillors were said to be excluded). After a prolonged discussion it was decided to postpone the decision on a replacement for Professor Jones.

W. Mabon Davies was replaced by a member who had withdrawn his name at the annual meeting some months previously.

W.J. Williams (Liberal), elected member for Quarter Bach

At the October quarterly meeting there was disagreemnet among members for the western division over a replacement for Professor Jones. The successful candiadte received 28 votes as opposed to 18 for the Rev. J.H. Rees and 10  for the Rev. Arthur Fuller-Mills of Carmarthen.

Ben Evans (Liberal), elected member for Rhydymcerau

By-elections between 1913 and 1919

Ammanford by-election, 1913
A by-election was held in the Ammanford division in June 1913 following the death of Councillor David Morris, a Liberal councillor. Erne Hewlett, general manager of Ammanford Collieries, and an active Conservative, ran on a non-political basis and won the seat, despite Liberal attempts to make the contest a political one.

Quarter Bach by-election, 1913
A by-election was held in the Quarter Bach division on 5 September 1913 following the elevation of W.J. Williams to the aldermanic bench.

References

1913
1913 Welsh local elections